Cuneiform KI (Borger 2003 nr. 737; U+121A0 ) is the sign for "earth". 
It is also read as GI5, GUNNI (=KI.NE) "hearth", KARAŠ (=KI.KAL.BAD) "encampment, army", KISLAḪ (=KI.UD) "threshing floor", and SUR7 (=KI.GAG). 
In Akkadian orthography, it functions as a determiner for toponyms and has the syllabic values gi, ge, qi, and qe.
Besides its phonetic value it also serves as determiner or "Sumerogram" marking placenames.

As a determiner, KI corresponds to Akkadian itti,

Cuneiform ki is used for syllabic "ki", and also for alphabetic "k", and alphabetic i. It has additional consonant usage for "q", instead of "k", and also "e", "é", and "í" for vowel "i". Its usage numbers from the Epic of Gilgamesh are as follows: ke-(9), ki-(291), qé-(18), qí-(62), and KI-(288).

References

Cuneiform signs